Philothermus is a genus of minute bark beetles in the family Cerylonidae. There are about 17 described species in Philothermus.

Species
These 17 species belong to the genus Philothermus:

 Philothermus borbonicus Dajoz, 1980
 Philothermus evanescens (Reitter, 1876)
 Philothermus exaratus (Chevrolat, 1864)
 Philothermus floridensis (Sen Gupta & Crowson, 1973)
 Philothermus glabriculus Leconte, 1863
 Philothermus gomyi Slipinski, 1982
 Philothermus guadeloupensis Grouvelle, 1902
 Philothermus kingsolveri Slipinski
 Philothermus liberiensis Sen Gupta & Crowson
 Philothermus montandoni Aubé, 1843
 Philothermus occidentalis Lawrence & Stephan, 1975
 Philothermus puberulus Schwarz, 1878
 Philothermus pubescens Sen Gupta & Crowson
 Philothermus semistriatus (Perris, 1865)
 Philothermus stephani Gimmel & Slipinski, 2007
 Philothermus vanua Slipinski
 Philothermus watti Slipinski

References

Further reading

External links

 

Cerylonidae
Articles created by Qbugbot
Coccinelloidea genera